Food Network Star is a reality television series that premiered June 5, 2005. It was produced by CBS EYEtoo Productions for seasons 1–8 and by Triage Entertainment for subsequent seasons. It airs on the Food Network in the United States. Prior to season seven, the series was known as The Next Food Network Star.

Season One

Summary

The first season of The Next Food Network Star series was taped in February 2005, and was composed of five episodes in June 2005. Chicago area caterers Dan Smith and Steve McDonagh emerged as the winners, and went on to host a show called Party Line with Dan & Steve, now titled Party Line with The Hearty Boys, which premiered on September 18, 2005.

The runner-up, Deborah Fewell, was chosen to host a special on food at beaches, Surf N Turf, which aired in June 2006. Michael Thomas was the recurring chef on The Tyra Banks Show. Susannah Locketti made an appearance on The Tony Danza Show, and is also an on-air chef for Publix grocery stores in the southern United States.

Contestants

Season Two

Summary

The second season of The Next Food Network Star series was taped in December 2005 and began airing in March 2006. Guy Fieri was announced as the winner on April 23, 2006, beating Reggie Southerland.

Fieri has achieved considerable success and a Daytime Emmy at Food Network since his victory, and is still regularly on air as of November 2021. Guy's Big Bite premiered in June 2006 and aired for 13 seasons until December 2016. Fieri's second series, Diners, Drive-Ins and Dives, premiered in April 2007 and has aired for 33 seasons, being the recipient of several Primetime Emmy Award nominations. He went on to the series, Ultimate Recipe Showdown, premiering February 17, 2008, and Guy Off The Hook on September 14, 2008. His reality competition Guy's Grocery Games debuted in October 2013 and has aired for 27 seasons.

Fourth-place contestant Nathan Lyon began hosting his own series, A Lyon In the Kitchen, on the Discovery Health Channel in March 2007.

Four of the seasons cast members along with Fieri reunited on Season 10 episode 4 of Guy’s Grocery Games which aired on July 24, 2016.

Contestants

Season Three

Summary
The third season began on June 3, 2007, and the winner was announced on Sunday, July 22.  In season 3, judges sent 1 or 2 contestants home weekly. Once the field was down to 2 final contestants, the viewers picked the winner. Marc Summers (host of the first 2 seasons) only returned for this season's finale.  Bobby Flay would host subsequent season finales.

During the season, the contestants lived in a shared house in New York City. The contestants' challenges included cooking concession food for an NBA game (with guest Darryl Dawkins) to a mini version of Food Network's Iron Chef America (with guest judges Bobby Flay and Cat Cora). The Selection Committee consisted of Food Network executives Bob Tuschman and Susie Fogelson along with one guest. Guest judges included Alton Brown, Giada De Laurentiis, Duff Goldman, season two winner Guy Fieri, and Robert Irvine.

Paula Deen and Rachael Ray participated in contestant challenges, and Bobby Flay also played a role in the guidance and selection process.  Amy Finley was chosen by America as The Next Food Network Star on July 22, 2007. Her new show The Gourmet Next Door premiered on October 14, 2007 and ran for six episodes.  Finley later declined to continue with the series, citing relocation to France for family reasons.

Among the contestants this season was former child actress Colombe Jacobsen-Derstine, best known for her appearances in the Mighty Ducks film franchise.

Contestants

:  Amy Finley was eliminated Week 7, and the original finalists were Rory Schepisi and Joshua "JAG" Garcia.  After the final elimination episode was aired, evidence came to light that JAG had lied about both his culinary training and his military service, representing both as more extensive than they actually were. Food Network allowed him to withdraw from the competition and reinstated Amy Finley, who was voted The Next Food Network Star.

Season Four

Summary
Season four of The Next Food Network Star premiered on Sunday, June 1, 2008. Food Network executives Bob Tuschman and Susie Fogelson are joined by Bobby Flay as the selection committee for this season. Each new episode aired on Sundays at 10:00 PM EDT. For this season, the viewers no longer received the chance to vote for the winner; producers instead made the final decision. This led to an error by FoodNetwork.com, which briefly posted the winning moment video on their website three days before the finale aired.  The winner for the fourth season was Aaron McCargo Jr. His winning show idea, Big Daddy's House, first aired August 3, 2008.

Finalist Adam Gertler was hired to host a Food Network show called Will Work for Food, which debuted on January 19, 2009 and was cancelled after one season. He hosted the Food Network show Kid in a Candy Store, which aired two seasons.

Kelsey Nixon co-hosted a web show on food2.com (a Food Network sister site aka Cooking Channel) and also appeared in the premiere of Chefs vs. City in 2009. In 2010, Gertler and Nixon became co-hosts of The Next Food Network Star After Party, a half-hour recap/interview show following that night's episode of Star, on Cooking Channel. Nixon stars in Kelsey's Essentials, a program on kitchen and cooking basics for The Cooking Channel that ran November, 2010–2013.

Contestants

Season Five

Summary
Season five of The Next Food Network Star premiered on June 7, 2009. Food Network executives Bob Tuschman and Susie Fogelson were joined by Bobby Flay as the Selection Committee for this season, which was filmed early 2009 in New York, New York and Miami, Florida. Melissa D'Arabian was declared the winner on August 2, 2009 with the title for her show being Ten Dollar Dinners.  Her show premiered on August 9, 2009.

On August 17, 2009, Food Network announced Jeffrey Saad would return in a series of online videos based on his pilot, now called "The Spice Smuggler." The program premiered with four -minute videos featuring one spice and a recipe incorporating it. Saad was named the national representative for the American Egg Board.  In November, 2010, Saad debuted in a new show for The Cooking Channel titled United Tastes of America, which explores multiple aspects of traditional American food.

Finalist Debbie Lee has carried her "Seoul to Soul" concept to the streets of L.A., opening a lunch truck, Ahn-Joo, featuring a range of Korean food.

Contestants

Season Six

Summary
The sixth season of the series premiered on Sunday, June 6, 2010.  Food Network executives Bob Tuschman and Susie Fogelson were again joined by Bobby Flay as judges; in addition, Giada De Laurentiis served as an on-set mentor.   On July 17, 2010, a post-competition recap and discussion show premiered on The Cooking Channel.  Shows were filmed in Los Angeles, California and New York, New York.

On August 15, 2010, Aarti Sequeira was declared the winner, and her new show Aarti Party premiered on Sunday, August 22, 2010 and features American style cuisine with unique Indian flair. Season 2 of Aarti Party premiered that December.

The Food Network also signed runner-up Tom Pizzica to host a new show called Outrageous Food, which premiered in November 2010. The last new episodes of Aarti Party aired in mid-2013.

Contestants

Season Seven

Summary
For the seventh season, the reality television series was renamed, after the first episode, Food Network Star, dropping the word "Next".  It premiered Sunday, June 5, 2011. Food Network executives Bob Tuschman and Susie Fogelson were joined again by Bobby Flay and Giada De Laurentiis as the judges for this season. The series was filmed in Los Angeles, California and New York, New York.

Season seven winner Jeff Mauro's show "Sandwich King" premiered on Sunday, August 21, 2011. In spring 2013, Jeff hosted $24 in 24, a show in which he went to several cities and ate an entire day's worth of meals on 24 dollars. Mauro is currently a co-host on "The Kitchen", airing Saturday mornings on Food Network with cohosts Sunny Anderson, Katie Lee and Geoffrey Zakarian.

Contestants

Season Eight

Summary
Season 8 started May 13, 2012.  For season 8, the format changed, with the contestants divided into three five-member teams, each coached by a Food Network host, either Bobby Flay, Alton Brown, or Giada De Laurentiis.  Coaches worked with the teams as they prepared for and completed their tasks.  The winner's coach would also be the producer of the winner's show.

Each week, a winning team was selected, and one member of the teams that did not win was up for elimination in a new feature called Producers' Challenge. Each challenge was hosted by current Food Network personalities.

The final winner was decided by an audience vote cast on foodnetwork.com between July 15–17, 2012 and the winner was announced on July 22, 2012. The winner was Justin Warner, who hosted a one-hour special on The Food Network, but did not have a series produced. He has become a blogger on foodnetwork.com, makes appearances at Food Network events, and is an active Twitter presence.

Coaches

 Alton Brown – host of Good Eats, Iron Chef America, The Next Iron Chef, and Cutthroat Kitchen.
 Bobby Flay – host of Grill It! with Bobby Flay,  Throwdown! with Bobby Flay. Co-host of season 3 of Worst Cooks in America and Iron Chef on Iron Chef America
 Giada De Laurentiis – host of Everyday Italian, Giada at Home and Giada in Italy.

Contestants

Season Nine

Summary
Season 9 started on June 2, 2013.  For season 9, Alton Brown, Bobby Flay, and Giada De Laurentiis mentored and judged twelve Food Network Star competitors, although the contestants were not divided into teams as in season 8. Many of this season's contestants had previously appeared on other Food Network shows. The winner was Damaris Phillips, decided by an audience vote cast on foodnetwork.com and announced live on August 11, 2013. Phillips hosted the Food Network show Southern at Heart for five seasons from 2013 to 2016. In 2018, she began co-hosting The Bobby and Damaris Show on Food Network with Bobby Flay. Phillips also cohosted "Southern and Hungry" with auto racing analyst Rutledge Wood in 2017.

Contestants

Season Ten

The winner was Lenny McNab, decided by an audience vote cast on foodnetwork.com and announced live on August 10, 2014.  It is the last season to date where the finale aired live—all subsequent season finales would be filmed months in advance prior to airing.

Contestants

Season Eleven

Beginning with this season, Alton Brown no longer appeared as a judge. The winner was Eddie Jackson, an ex NFL player and MasterChef (American season 4) contestant.

Contestants

Season Twelve

Martita Jara originally competed in the eighth season of the series; she returned after winning the pre-season competition Comeback Kitchen.

Contestants

Season Thirteen

Matthew Grunwald originally competed in season 11. He returned for a second chance after winning the Comeback Kitchen competition.

Contestants

Season Fourteen

Contestants
This season features Manny Washington and Katie Dixon from MasterChef (American season 7) and Palak Patel who beats Bobby Flay. Amy Pottinger originally competed in season 13. She returned for a second chance after winning the Comeback Kitchen competition, along with Adam Gertler, who originally competed in season four.

Notes

References

External links
 
 

 
2005 American television series debuts
2000s American reality television series
2010s American reality television series
English-language television shows
Food Network original programming
Television series by CBS Studios
2018 American television series endings